Carrowhubbock may refer to the following places in the Republic of Ireland:

Carrowhubbock North, a townland near Enniscrone, County Sligo
Carrowhubbock South, a townland of Enniscrone, County Sligo